Ronne or Rønne can refer to the following:

People
Arne Falk-Rønne (1920-1992), Danish author and adventurer
David M. Ronne (1943–2007), American sound engineer and three-time nominee for the Academy Award for Best Sound
Edith Ronne, American explorer of Antarctica, wife of Finn Ronne
Finn Ronne (1899–1980), American explorer of Antarctica
Friedrich Ludwig von Ronne (1798–1865), Prussian jurist, politician, diplomat and German Ambassador to the United States
Hans Rønne (1887-1951), Danish gymnast
Henning Rønne (1878-1947), Danish ophthalmologist
Jackie Ronne (1919-2009), American explorer of Antarctica and first woman in the world to be a working member of an Antarctic expedition
Martin Rønne (1861–1932), polar explorer
Veronica Ronne Froman (born 1947), US Navy rear admiral
Ronne Arnold (1938/39–2020), American-Australian dancer and actor
Ronne Hartfield (born 1936), American writer and academic
Ronne Troup (born 1945), American actress

Places
Rønne, a town and former municipality in Denmark
Rönne River, Sweden
Ronne Entrance, a broad southwest entrance of the George VI Sound, named after Finn Ronne
Mount Ronne, Marie Byrd Land, Antarctica

Other
Ronne Antarctic Research Expedition, an Antarctica expedition in 1947-1948, led by Finn Ronne

See also
Ronne-Filchner or Filchner-Ronne Ice Shelf, the second largest ice shelf in Antarctica, named in part after Jackie Ronne
Rönne (disambiguation)
Ronnes, a list of people with the surname